Elizaveta Aleksandrovna (Endaurova) Busch (1886–1960) was a botanist in the Soviet Union known for studying the flora of the North Caucasus and Siberia.

References 

1886 births
1960 deaths
Soviet  botanists